North American Kant Society (NAKS) is an organization whose purpose is to advance the study of Kantian thought and scholarship. It was established in 1985.

Awards
Markus Herz Prize for Graduate Students
Wilfrid Sellars Essay Prize for Early Career Scholars
Senior Scholar Article and Book Prizes

See also
North American Nietzsche Society

References

External links
Official website

Philosophical societies in the United States
1985 establishments in the United States
Organizations established in 1985
American philosophy
Immanuel Kant